Valentino Knowles (born 16 August 1988) is a Bahamian former professional boxer.

Career
As an amateur, Knowles represented the Bahamas across various international competitions in the light welterweight division. His best performances include a gold medal at the 2010 Central American and Caribbean Games, a silver medal at the 2011 Pan American Games and a bronze medal at the 2010 Commonwealth Games. He also competed at the AIBA World Boxing Championships in 2009 and 2011.

Knowles missed qualification for the 2012 Summer Olympics and soon after turned professional. He fought two professional bouts in 2013, both wins, over Ruben Ozuna and Alejandro Ochoa. During this time he trained in Miami, under Orlando Cuellar.

Shooting
His career was ended by a shooting in 2014, outside an apartment complex in the Kemp Road area of Nassau. Shots were fired at Knowles and three other pedestrians from a vehicle which had pulled up, with the boxer struck multiple times. Knowles was shot in the leg, upper right chest, chin and twice in his left hand. He was sent to hospital in a serious condition but doctors were able to save his life. His leg was broken in three places and he suffered a fractured jaw.

He is now a certified international amateur boxing coach.

References

External links

1988 births
Living people
Bahamian male boxers
Commonwealth Games bronze medallists for the Bahamas
Commonwealth Games medallists in boxing
Boxers at the 2010 Commonwealth Games
Pan American Games silver medalists for the Bahamas
Boxers at the 2011 Pan American Games
Light-welterweight boxers
Shooting survivors
Sportspeople from Nassau, Bahamas
Pan American Games medalists in boxing
Central American and Caribbean Games gold medalists for the Bahamas
Competitors at the 2010 Central American and Caribbean Games
Central American and Caribbean Games medalists in boxing
Medalists at the 2011 Pan American Games
Medallists at the 2010 Commonwealth Games